Yushania is a genus of bamboo in the grass family.

Recent classification systems place Yushania in the tribe Arundinarieae.

The species of Yushania are evergreen, spreading,  thornless bamboos native to Himalayan, African, Chinese, and Southeast Asian mountains at moderate to high altitudes, up to 3000 m.

Yushania contains species formerly classified as members of Arundinaria, as well as one species that is still considered to be a Sinarundinaria by some.

Some species of Yushania are popular to cultivate.

Species

Formerly included
see Chimonocalamus Drepanostachyum Fargesia Gelidocalamus Otatea Pseudosasa Sarocalamus

References

External links 

Bambusoideae
Bambusoideae genera